is a Japanese ice hockey player. He competed in the men's tournament at the 1998 Winter Olympics.

In August 2021, he became the Assistant Coach for the Wheeling Nailers on where he had been a player on the inaugural 1992-93 team, which reached the Riley Cup Final.

References

External links
 

1972 births
Living people
Belfast Giants players
Fredericton Canadiens players
High1 players
Ice hockey people from Ontario
Ice hockey players at the 1998 Winter Olympics
Japanese ice hockey players
Canadian sportspeople of Japanese descent
Kokudo Keikaku players
Montreal Canadiens draft picks
Nippon Paper Cranes players
Olympic ice hockey players of Japan
Ottawa 67's players
Sportspeople from Hamilton, Ontario
Wheeling Thunderbirds players
Asian Games gold medalists for Japan
Asian Games silver medalists for Japan
Medalists at the 1999 Asian Winter Games
Medalists at the 2003 Asian Winter Games
Ice hockey players at the 1999 Asian Winter Games
Ice hockey players at the 2003 Asian Winter Games
Asian Games medalists in ice hockey
Canadian expatriate ice hockey players in the United States
Japanese expatriate ice hockey people
Expatriate ice hockey players in Northern Ireland
Expatriate ice hockey players in South Korea
Japanese expatriate sportspeople in South Korea
Japanese expatriate sportspeople in Northern Ireland
Canadian expatriate ice hockey players in Northern Ireland
Canadian expatriate ice hockey players in South Korea
Canadian ice hockey coaches